Vasco Batista (born 27 March 1974) is a Portuguese sailor. He competed in the Finn event at the 1996 Summer Olympics.

References

External links
 

1974 births
Living people
Portuguese male sailors (sport)
Olympic sailors of Portugal
Sailors at the 1996 Summer Olympics – Finn
Place of birth missing (living people)